Griffith Peak is a rock peak rising over  in the western Wisconsin Range of Antarctica, standing at the north side of the mouth of Hueneme Glacier at the junction with Reedy Glacier. It was mapped by the United States Geological Survey from surveys and U.S. Navy air photos, 1960–64, and was named by the Advisory Committee on Antarctic Names for Raymond E. Griffith, a cook with the winter parties at Byrd Station in 1961 and 1963.

References

Mountains of Marie Byrd Land